Custom Robo, known in Japan as  is an action role-playing video game developed by Noise and published by Nintendo for the GameCube. It is the fourth title of the Custom Robo series, and the first title of the series released outside Japan.

Gameplay

Story
In this title of the Custom Robo series, each player is called a "commander", who pilots and customizes a miniature "robo" to battle each other in a virtual arena called a Holosseum; the average robo is 32 centimeters tall. The majority of the story takes place in a campaign-like mode titled "A New Journey". After this mode is completed, the player may choose to go through the story again or select a new mode consisting of a series of tournaments called "The Grand Battle".

The main objective of the game is to engage in battle with other robos, collect every custom robo, battle part, and item that the player wants; winning every battle moves the player from one part of the storyline to the next. During battles, the objective is to reduce the opponent's hit points from 1000 to 0 by using different custom robos and their arsenal of weapons, including dash attacks, guns, bombs, and pods.

Battling
Fights take place in a Holosseum, a battle arena designed for custom robos. Some commanders can make their own Holosseums, or they can use a pre-created Holosseum taken from a Holosseum deck or in the robo itself. Holosseums come in a variety of sizes and layouts, and some feature environmental hazards such as ice or lava.

Before battling begins, players customize their robos from 5 types of parts: the chassis (the robo itself), the gun (right hand), the bomb (left hand), the pod (backpack), and the legs (attachments to your legs and feet). The chassis are arranged in groups that designate the model, which affects its traits. In addition, there are 3 types of the same model.

Battles begin with robo being launched out of a Robocannon, which is controlled with the Control Stick. Robos are shot from the Cannon in the form of cubes; there are six sides numbered 1 to 6, which designate how long the player's robo has before transforming. Players can speed up the process up by pressing any button repeatedly. The first robo to transform gets to attack first - an attack brings them to transform immediately. There are two views in battle: Normal view is the view that allows the player to see both the Custom Robos in an isometric view. First-person view allows to see from robo's point of view. Players can change views during a battle by pressing up on the C-stick after "A New Journey" is completed. The endurance bar is located above your hit points. Once it runs out, their robo gets "downed", which means that it becomes unresponsive for a couple seconds; they can speed up the process of recovering by repeatedly tapping the A button. After it gets up, it goes into "rebirth", where it briefly turns invincible for about 3 seconds. If the player repeatedly loses the same battle, the game offers the option of reducing the opponent's initial health. This goes up to the opponent losing 250 HP.

Plot
The story opens with a flashback from the hero's earlier life.

The main character "hero", is a child whose father has disappeared. Before his mysterious departure, Hero's father gave him a watch, telling him to keep it safe. At this point, the game leaps to the present and Hero suddenly receives a letter stating that his father has just died. In honor of his father's wishes for him to become a Robo Commander, Hero sets out to do so - despite knowing nothing about robos. He eventually manages to join up with a group of bounty hunters known as the "Steel Hearts", where he meets Ernest, Harry, and Marcia. A fellow member of the Steel Hearts, Harry, teaches Hero how to command robos and helps him receive his license, which allows Hero to battle with robos legally. After a few minor errands, Hero and company discover the self-guided Robo known as 'Rahu'. Later, after passing a test and obtaining a Class "S" license, Rahu's past is revealed and Hero finds out that Rahu is an invisible organic being who had accidentally been fused with a toy robot.

Before the time of the domed city, the world was attacked by a powerful entity - now known as Rahu. Eventually, Rahu came to possess a child's toy. This toy was very similar to a Robo. By popularizing Robo battling, the government gave the people a way to fight the entity. Rahu was soon damaged enough to be driven into dormancy for a long period of time, but has now awoken. Hero and the rest of the police force leave the safety of the dome to defeat Rahu again, along with the organization known as the Z-Syndicate, who are trying to control the entity for their own ends. After defeating the syndicate, Hero meets an old friend of his father's, and the brother of Marcia of the Steel Hearts, a spy named Sergei. He originally joined the Z Syndicate to stop Rahu, but was forced to work with Oboro, who wanted to control Rahu for his own means. Eliza and Isabella, two other members of the Z Syndicate, also wanted to control Rahu. Sergei showed Hero an old recording of his father's last message to him. In the recording, Hero's father explains that he left to form the Z-Syndicate in an attempt to inform the people of Rahu's impending attack. The other members soon lost sight of his vision and betrayed him in an attempt to the seize control of the Syndicate and Rahu. Hero, Harry, and Marcia eventually defeat Rahu, ensuring the world's safety - for a while.

Characters
Hero (Main Character): The main character is a young man whose only family was his father. His father left him when he was very young, and his mother died shortly before that. His father left him with a watch. He lives in a Triplex with a couple, their children, and his landlady. The given name for the Hero is given by the player of the game at its beginning. 
Hero's dad: The main character's dad was once the leader of Z Syndicate. When he died, Z was split in between Oboro and the Eliza/Isabella duo (the latter of whom are twins). He commanded Ray Legend (illegal), a Shining Fighter model.
Lucy: The hero's landlady who wakes him up every morning. She knows nothing about Custom Robos although later in the game, she ends up acquiring a Robo of her own, a Tank Head (Funky Big Head) in "The Grand Battle".
Harry: A member of the Steel Hearts who first wanted to have the hero join so that he can boss him around. He becomes the hero's best friend. He tries to be a real ladies man, and it seems to work sometimes, but he often fails. It turns out after the hero joins, Harry is still the one being pushed around. He will give out some good tips and advice before most battles. Harry commands Glory (Shining Fighter).
Marcia: A member of the Steel Hearts who is the pride of the team for some part of the game. When she was orphaned, she lived with her big brother—an ex member of the police squad—until he left suddenly. She has the ability to "Half-Dive" (which means to see through a Robo's eyes and even read the last thoughts of the Robo's Commander) and when she does, it can strain her mentally, so she cannot half dive for too long. Marcia commands Milky Way (Aerial Beauty). It is hinted that the hero may have a crush on her.
Ernest: The leader, manager, boss, and CEO of the Steel Hearts. He does not do much but call members of the Steel Hearts and give them their assignments, but usually just ends up yelling at them. In "The Grand Battle" he's in a few parts but serves no major purpose apart from organizing the Steel Hearts Cup. He has a keen eye for poetry. Ernest commands Metal Bear (Metal Grappler).
Linda: The Lab director and scientist. She is the person that gives the hero Ray 01. Both Ernest and Harry have a crush on her. Linda commands Seeker (Lightning Sky).
Evil: The "Arch-Nemesis". He runs another bounty hunter group named Dark Blue. He also has a huge ego. Evil thinks of himself as a king and that he is caring and the smartest one of them all. He often says he threw a fight on purpose when he loses, but he lets his pride interfere with everything, yet that does not prevent him from keeping his loyal (and slightly dim witted) minions by his side. Evil commands Juggler (Trick Flyer).
The police squad: Group of people who only actually worked in one part of the game. To join it is needed to take and pass a Class-A test. Marcia wants to join the Police Squad in hopes of finding her long lost big brother. Harry's older sister is a high-ranking member who constantly tries to get him to join. The only similarity in their battles is that almost all of them use the High Rise Cell as their course.
Mira: Harry's older sister. The captain of the police squad, who is constantly trying to get Harry to join. She has a class 'S' license. Mira commands Sol (Aerial Beauty).
Roy: The lieutenant of the police squad and Mira's partner and right-hand man, he is very devoted to the police force and dislikes Harry more than the Steel Hearts (and all mercenaries). He has a class 'S' license. Roy commands Halberd (Strike Vanisher).
Sergei: Former member of the Police Squad, and Marcia's big brother. He was departed to the outside world, joining Z before it was controlled by Oboro and Eliza. He wishes to fulfill the true director of Z's ultimate vision. Sergei commands Ruhiel (an illegal Lightning Sky).
Shiner: A commander of the Z Syndicate. He follows Oboro and is the only commander who doesn't use an illegal body, but he sometimes uses an illegal gun. Shiner commands Breaker (Lightning Sky).
Eliza and Isabella: Twin sisters and leaders of the Z-Syndicate. They use the twin factor to confuse the protagonists sometime in the story. They are two of the main antagonists. They both command Athenas (an illegal Aerial Beauty).
Oboro: A leader of the Z-Syndicate and one of the main antagonists. He commands Rakansen (an illegal Strike Vanisher).
Rahu: An invisible, intangible being that ultimately destroyed the world outside the dome. Upon contact with a robo, it became "stuck" in the robo's body, giving it corporeal form for the first time and rendering it vulnerable in robo battles.  Rahu serves as the true main antagonist of the game. It is constantly evolving, demonstrated by the multiple forms it is fought in throughout the game, and is the only "custom robo" that can exist outside a Holosseum in full form. Rahu's name comes from Hindu mythology, a snake that eats the sun and moon causing eclipses.

Reception

The game received "mixed" reviews according to video game review aggregator Metacritic.  In Japan, Famitsu gave it a score of two sevens and two eights for a total of 30 out of 40. However, in retrospective reception the game has been heavily praised and is frequently featured in several "Best GameCube games" lists and countdowns.

Notes

References

External links
 
 

Role-playing video games
Action role-playing video games
GameCube games
GameCube-only games
Noise (company) games
Multiplayer and single-player video games
2004 video games
Custom Robo
Video games developed in Japan
Video games scored by Takayuki Nakamura